Seth Byron Worley (born April 26, 1984) is an American film director and writer. teacher, and entrepreneur whose short films, commercials, and explainer videos for clients like Bad Robot and Sandwich Video have been featured in Forbes, The Hollywood Reporter, Fast Company, The Tonight Show, and more. Since 2012, he's served as senior content creator at Red Giant, creating short films and tutorials to market the software company's tools for visual effects and motion design. He also co-founded the company Plot Devices in 2017 to offer products for filmmaking and story development. Plot Device's first product, the Storyclock Notebook, was brought to life by 5,354 Kickstarter backers, raising over $120,000 in 30 days.

His short films include: Plot Device (2011), Tempo (2012), Form 17 (2012), Spy Vs Guy (2013), Real Gone (2015), Old/New narrated by Patton Oswalt and Go Bag (2016). In 2013, he directed Space Fender Bender, a TV Commercial for Star Trek Into Darkness and Esurance.

He won a Dove Award for Youth/Children's Musical of the Year in 2001 for Friends 4ever along with Karla Worley, Steven V. Taylor, Peter Kipley and Michael W. Smith; Word Music.

Seth has also produced a handful of acclaimed short films, including Adventure Now [1,2 and 3] starring Mitch Miller, Darren Vandergriff, Garrett Walker, Jeff Venable, and Lydia Campbell, Suburban Tumbleweed and The Time Closet, the latter of which he adapted into his first feature film as writer and director. He lives in Nashville, Tennessee with his wife and three children.

In June 2011, Red Giant Software released a short directed and co-written by Seth, entitled Plot Device. The short, created to highlight features of Red Giant's Magic Bullet Suite of video tools, starred Seth's brother Ben Worley (who co-wrote the score) and was made with the assistance of Mitch Miller, Jeff Venable, Neil Hoppe and many others. The film became an instant Internet sensation, garnering Seth attention across the Web and in Hollywood.

In August 2011, it was announced Seth had signed a representation agreement with ICM Partners in Hollywood.

In November 2013, he directed a video for Steve Taylor's new Kickstarter campaign.

See also
Cinema of the United States

References

External links
 

Living people
1984 births